"Little Sister" is a rock and roll song written by Doc Pomus and Mort Shuman. It was originally released as a single in 1961 by American singer Elvis Presley, who enjoyed a No. 5 hit with it on the Billboard Hot 100. The single (as a double A-side with "(Marie's the Name) His Latest Flame") also reached No. 1 in the UK Singles Chart.
Lead guitar was played by Hank Garland and the rhythm guitar was played by Scotty Moore with backing vocals by the Jordanaires featuring the distinctive bass voice of Ray Walker.

Presley performs it as part of a medley with "Get Back" in the 1970 rockumentary film Elvis: That's the Way It Is. "Little Sister" would later be covered by such artists as Dwight Yoakam, Robert Plant, The Nighthawks, and Pearl Jam. A version by Ry Cooder, from his album Bop Till You Drop, was a number-one hit in New Zealand.

The lyric makes mention of "Jim Dandy" which was the title of a 1956 tune"Jim Dandy" by LaVern Baker. An answer song to "Little Sister", with the same melody but different lyrics, was recorded and released under the title "Hey, Memphis" by Baker on Atlantic Records (Atlantic 2119-A) in September 1961.

Personnel 
Elvis Presley - lead vocals
Hank Garland - lead guitar
Scotty Moore - rhythm guitar
Harold Bradley - six string bass
DJ Fontana - drums
The Jordanaires - backing vocals
 Live personnel
 Elvis presley - vocals and first rhythm guitar
 James Burton - lead guitar
 John Wilkinson - second rhythm guitar
 Charlie Hodge - acoustic guitar
 Jerry Scheff - bass
 Ron Tutt - drums

Chart positions

Elvis Presley

Personnel
Recorded in RCA Studio B, Nashville, Tennessee, June 25, 1961
.
 Scotty Moore – acoustic guitar
 Hank Garland – electric guitar
 Harold Bradley – 6-string bass guitar
 Bob Moore – bass
 D. J. Fontana and Buddy Harman – drums
 The Jordanaires – backing vocals

Dwight Yoakam version

Music video
The music video for Dwight Yoakam's 1987 version of "Little Sister" was directed by Sherman Halsey.

Other recorded versions 
 Ry Cooder as the opening track on his 1979 album Bop Till You Drop.
 Rockpile with Robert Plant on the 1981 album Concerts for the People of Kampuchea.

References

1961 songs
1961 singles
1987 singles
Elvis Presley songs
Dwight Yoakam songs
Songs with music by Mort Shuman
Songs with lyrics by Doc Pomus
UK Singles Chart number-one singles
Number-one singles in New Zealand
RCA Victor singles
Reprise Records singles
Music videos directed by Sherman Halsey
Songs about siblings
Song recordings produced by Stephen H. Sholes
Song recordings produced by Pete Anderson